Puerto Rico Highway 205 (PR-205) is a short avenue in Naguabo, Puerto Rico. This road connects PR-53 with PR-31 in the urban area.

Major intersections

See also

 List of highways numbered 205

References

External links
 

205
Naguabo, Puerto Rico